Field Marshal Sam Hormusji Framji Jamshedji Manekshaw  (3 April 1914 – 27 June 2008), widely known as Sam Manekshaw and Sam Bahadur ("Sam the Brave"), was the Chief of the Army Staff of the Indian Army during the Indo-Pakistani War of 1971, and the first Indian Army officer to be promoted to the rank of field marshal. His active military career spanned four decades and five wars, beginning with service in the British Indian Army in World War II.

Manekshaw joined the first intake of the Indian Military Academy, Dehradun, in 1932. He was commissioned into the 4th Battalion, 12th Frontier Force Regiment. In World War II, he was awarded the Military Cross for gallantry. Following the partition of India in 1947, he was reassigned to the 8th Gorkha Rifles. Manekshaw was seconded to a planning role during the 1947 Indo-Pakistani War and the Hyderabad crisis, and as a result, he never commanded an infantry battalion. He was promoted to the rank of brigadier while serving at the Military Operations Directorate. He became commander of 167 Infantry Brigade in 1952 and served in this position until 1954 when he took over as the Director of Military Training at Army Headquarters.

After completing the higher command course at the Imperial Defence College, he was appointed General Officer Commanding the 26th Infantry Division. He also served as the Commandant of the Defence Services Staff College. In 1963, Manekshaw was promoted to the position of army commander and took over Western Command, transferring in 1964 to the Eastern Command.

Having already commanded troops at division, corps and regional levels, Manekshaw became the seventh chief of the army staff in 1969. Under his command, Indian forces conducted victorious campaigns against Pakistan in the Indo-Pakistani War of 1971, which led to the creation of Bangladesh in December 1971. He was awarded the Padma Vibhushan and the Padma Bhushan, the second and third highest civilian awards of India.

Early life and education
Sam Manekshaw was born on 3 April 1914 in Amritsar, Punjab, to Hormizd Manekshaw (1871–1964), who was a doctor, and Hilla, née Mehta (1885–1973), both Parsis who moved to Amritsar from the city of Valsad in the coastal Gujarat region. Manekshaw's parents had left Mumbai in 1903 for Lahore, where Hormizd had friends and where he was to begin practising medicine. However, by the time their train halted at Amritsar (trains used to make very long halts in those days), Hilla, who was pregnant, found it impossible to travel any further. The couple had to break journey to seek help from the station master, who advised that in her condition, Hilla should not attempt any journey until her confinement. By the time that happened, the couple had found Amritsar salubrious and elected to settle in the city. Hormusji soon established a thriving clinic and pharmacy in the centre of Amritsar. The couple had six children over the following decade, numbering four sons and two daughters (Fali, Cilla, Jan, Sheru, Sam and Jami), of whom Sam was their fifth child and third son.

During the Second World War, Hormusji Manekshaw served in the British Indian Army as a captain in the Indian Medical Service (IMS; now the Army Medical Corps). Of the Manekshaw siblings, Sam's two elder brothers Fali and Jan qualified as engineers, while Cilla and Sheru became teachers. Both Sam and his younger brother Jami served in the Indian Armed Forces, with Jami becoming a doctor like his father and serving in the Royal Indian Air Force as a medical officer; the first Indian to be awarded the air surgeon's wings from the Naval Air Station Pensacola in the United States, Jami joined his elder brother in becoming a flag officer, retiring as an air vice marshal in the Indian Air Force.

As a boy, Manekshaw was mischievous and high-spirited. His early ambition was to study medicine and become a doctor like his father. He completed his primary schooling in Punjab, and then went to Sherwood College, Nainital. In 1929, he left the college at the age of 15 with his Junior Cambridge Certificate, an English language curriculum developed by the University of Cambridge International Examinations. In 1931, he passed his Senior Cambridge (in the School Certificate of the Cambridge Board) with distinction. Manekshaw then asked his father to send him to London to study medicine, but his father refused on the grounds that he was not old enough; in addition, he was already supporting the studies of Manekshaw's two elder brothers, both of whom were studying engineering in London. Instead, Manekshaw entered the Hindu Sabha College (now the Hindu College, Amritsar), and in April 1932 sat his final exams held by the University of the Punjab, passing with a third division in science.

In the meantime, the Indian Military College Committee, which was set up in 1931 and chaired by Field Marshal Sir Philip Chetwode, recommended the establishment of a military academy in India to train Indians for officer commissions in the army. A three-year course was proposed, with an entry age of 18 to 20 years. Candidates would be selected on the basis of an examination conducted by the Public Service Commission. A formal notification for entrance examination to enrol in the Indian Military Academy (IMA) was issued in the early months of 1932, and examinations were scheduled for June or July. In an act of rebellion against his father's refusal, Manekshaw applied for a place and sat the entrance exams in Delhi. On 1 October 1932, he was one of the fifteen cadets to be selected through open competition. Manekshaw was placed sixth in the order of merit.

Indian Military Academy
Manekshaw was selected as part of the first batch of cadets. Called "The Pioneers", his class also produced Smith Dun and Muhammad Musa Khan, future commanders-in-chief of Burma and Pakistan, respectively. Although the academy was inaugurated by Chetwode on 10 December 1932, the cadets' military training commenced on 1 October 1932. Manekshaw proved to be witty during his stay at IMA and went on to achieve a number of firsts: the first graduate to join one of the Gorkha regiments; first to serve as the Chief of the Army Staff of India; and first to attain the rank of field marshal. Of the 40 cadets inducted, only 22 completed the course, and they were commissioned as second lieutenants on 1 February 1935 with antedated seniority from 4 February 1934.

Military career
At the time of Manekshaw's commissioning, it was standard practice for newly commissioned Indian officers to be initially attached to a British regiment before being sent to an Indian unit. Thus, Manekshaw joined the 2nd Battalion, Royal Scots, stationed at Lahore. He was later posted to the 4th Battalion, 12th Frontier Force Regiment, stationed in Burma. On 1 May 1938, he was appointed quartermaster of his company. Already fluent in Punjabi, Hindi, Urdu, English and his parental language of Gujarati, in October 1938 Manekshaw qualified as a Higher Standard army interpreter in Pashto.

World War II 
Because of a shortage of qualified officers on the outbreak of war, in the first two years of the conflict Manekshaw was appointed to the acting or temporary ranks of captain and major before promotion to substantive captain on 4 February 1942. He saw action in Burma in the 1942 campaign at the Sittang River with the 4th Battalion, 12th Frontier Force Regiment, and was recognised for bravery in battle. During the fighting around Pagoda Hill, a key position on the left of the Sittang bridgehead, he led his company in a counter-attack against the invading Imperial Japanese Army; despite suffering 50% casualties the company managed to achieve its objective. After capturing the hill, Manekshaw was hit by a burst of light machine gun fire and was severely wounded in the stomach. Observing the battle, Maj. Gen. David Cowan, commander of the 17th Infantry Division, spotted Manekshaw clinging to life and, having witnessed his valour in the face of stiff resistance, rushed over to him. Fearing that Manekshaw would die, the general pinned his own Military Cross ribbon on him saying, "A dead person cannot be awarded a Military Cross". This award was made official with the publication of the notification in a supplement to the London Gazette on 21 April 1942 (dated 23 April 1942). The citation (which was not made public), reads as follows:

Manekshaw was evacuated from the battlefield by Sher Singh, his orderly, who took him to an Australian surgeon. The surgeon initially declined to treat Manekshaw, saying that he was badly wounded and his chances of survival were very low, but Singh forced him to treat Manekshaw. Manekshaw regained consciousness, and when the surgeon asked what had happened to him, he replied that he was "kicked by a mule". Impressed by Manekshaw's sense of humour, he treated him, removing seven bullets from lungs, liver, and kidneys. Much of his intestines were also removed. Over Manekshaw's protests that he treat the other patients, the regimental medical officer, Captain G. M. Diwan, attended to him.

Having recovered from his wounds, Manekshaw attended the eighth staff course at Command and Staff College in Quetta between 23 August and 22 December 1943. On completion, he was posted as the brigade major to the Razmak Brigade, serving in that post until 22 October 1944, after which he joined the 9th Battalion, 12th Frontier Force Regiment, in Gen. William Slim's 14th Army. On 30 October 1944, he received the local rank of lieutenant colonel. On the Japanese surrender, Manekshaw was appointed to supervise the disarmament of over 60,000 Japanese prisoners of war (POWs). He handled this so well that no cases of indiscipline or escape attempts from the camp were reported. He was promoted to acting lieutenant colonel on 5 May 1946, and completed a six-month lecture tour of Australia. Manekshaw was promoted to the substantive rank of major on 4 February 1947, and on his return from Australia was appointed a Grade 1 General Staff Officer (GSO1) in the Military Operations (MO) Directorate.

Post-independence
On the Partition of India in 1947, Manekshaw's unit, the 4th Battalion, 12th Frontier Force Regiment, became part of the Pakistan Army, so Manekshaw was reassigned to the 8th Gorkha Rifles. While handling the issues relating to partition in 1947, Manekshaw demonstrated his planning and administrative skills in his capacity as GSO1. At the end of 1947, Manekshaw was posted as the commanding officer of the 3rd Battalion, 5 Gorkha Rifles (Frontier Force) (3/5 GR (FF)). Before he moved on to his new appointment on 22 October, Pakistani forces infiltrated Kashmir, capturing Domel and Muzaffarabad. The following day, the ruler of the princely state of Jammu and Kashmir, Maharaja Hari Singh, appealed for help from India. On 25 October, Manekshaw accompanied V. P. Menon, the secretary of the States Department, to Srinagar. While Menon was with the Maharaja, Manekshaw carried out an aerial survey of the situation in Kashmir. According to Manekshaw, the Maharaja signed the Instrument of Accession on the same day, and they flew back to Delhi. Lord Mountbatten and the Prime Minister, Jawaharlal Nehru, were briefed, during which Manekshaw suggested immediate deployments of troops to prevent Kashmir from being captured.

On the morning of 27 October, Indian troops were sent to Kashmir to defend Srinagar from Pakistani forces which had by then reached the city's outskirts. Manekshaw's posting order as the commander of 3/5 GR (FF) was cancelled, and he was posted to the MO Directorate. As a consequence of the Kashmir dispute and the annexation of Hyderabad (code-named "Operation Polo"), which was also planned by the MO Directorate, Manekshaw never commanded a battalion. During his term at the MO Directorate, he was promoted to colonel, then brigadier when he was appointed as the first Indian Director of Military Operations. This appointment was later upgraded to major general and then to lieutenant general, and is now termed Director General Military Operations (DGMO).

Manekshaw was promoted to substantive colonel on 4 February 1952, and in April was appointed the commander of 167 Infantry Brigade, headquartered at Firozpur. On 9 April 1954, he was appointed the Director of Military Training at Army Headquarters. As an acting brigadier (substantive colonel), he was posted as commandant of the Infantry School at Mhow on 14 January 1955, and also became the colonel of both the 8th Gorkha Rifles and the 61st Cavalry. During his tenure as the commandant of the Infantry School, he discovered that the training manuals were outdated, and was instrumental in revamping them to be consistent with the tactics employed by the Indian Army. He was promoted to the substantive rank of brigadier on 4 February 1957.

General officer
In 1957, he was sent to the Imperial Defence College, London, to attend a higher command course for one year. On his return, he was appointed the General Officer Commanding (GOC) 26th Infantry Division on 20 December 1957, with the acting rank of major general. While he commanded the division, Gen. K. S. Thimayya was the Chief of the Army Staff (COAS), and Krishna Menon the defence minister. During a visit to Manekshaw's division, Menon asked him what he thought of Thimayya. Manekshaw replied that it was not appropriate for him to think of his chief in that way, as he considered it improper to evaluate his superior, and told Menon not to ask anybody again. This annoyed Menon, and he told Manekshaw that if he wanted to, he could sack Thimayya, to which Manekshaw replied, "You can get rid of him. But then I will get another."

Manekshaw was promoted to substantive major general on 1 March 1959. On 1 October, he was appointed the Commandant of the Defence Services Staff College, Wellington, where he was caught up in a controversy that almost ended his career. In May 1961, Thimayya resigned as the COAS, and was succeeded by Gen. Pran Nath Thapar. Earlier in the year, Maj. Gen. Brij Mohan Kaul had been promoted to lieutenant general and appointed the Quarter Master General (QMG) by Menon. The appointment was made against the recommendation of Thimayya, who resigned as a result. Kaul was made the Chief of General Staff (CGS), the second highest appointment at Army Headquarters after the COAS. Kaul cultivated a close relationship with Nehru and Menon and became even more powerful than the COAS. This was met with disapproval by senior army officials, including Manekshaw, who made derogatory comments about the interference of the political leadership in the administration of the army. This led him to be marked as an anti-national.

Kaul sent informers to spy on Manekshaw who, as a result of the information gathered, was charged with sedition, and subjected to a court of inquiry. Meanwhile, two of his juniors, Harbaksh Singh and Moti Sagar, were promoted to lieutenant general and appointed as corps commanders. It was widely believed that Manekshaw had come close to being dismissed from the service. The court, presided over by the General Officer Commanding-in-Chief (GOC-in-C) of the Western Command, Lt. Gen. Daulet Singh, known for his integrity, exonerated Manekshaw. Before a formal 'no case to answer' could be announced, the Sino-Indian War broke out; Manekshaw was not able to participate because of the court proceedings. The Indian Army suffered a debacle in the war, for which Kaul and Menon were held primarily responsible, and both were sacked. In November 1962, Nehru asked Manekshaw to take over the command of IV Corps. Manekshaw told Nehru that the court action against him was a conspiracy, and that his promotion had been due for almost eighteen months; Nehru apologised. Shortly after, on 2 December 1962, Manekshaw was promoted to acting lieutenant general and appointed GOC of IV Corps at Tezpur.

Soon after taking charge, Manekshaw reached the conclusion that poor leadership had been a significant factor in IV Corps' failure in the war with China. He felt that his foremost responsibility was to improve the morale of his demoralised soldiers, which he achieved by ordering them to operate more aggressively. Just five days into his command, Nehru visited the headquarters with his daughter Indira Gandhi and the COAS, and found the troops advancing. Nehru stated that he did not want any more men to die. The COAS assured him that he would get the orders to advance rescinded. Manekshaw retorted that he should be allowed to command his troops the way he wished, or he should be sent to a staff appointment. Gandhi intervened and told Manekshaw to go ahead. Though Gandhi had no official position, she had great influence in the government. The next task Manekshaw took up was to reorganise the troops in the North-East Frontier Agency (NEFA), where he took measures to overcome shortages of equipment, accommodation, and clothing.

Promoted to substantive lieutenant general on 20 July 1963, Manekshaw was appointed an army commander on 5 December, taking command of Western Command as GOC-in-C. In 1964, he moved from Shimla to Calcutta as the GOC-in-C Eastern Command, having received his appointment on 16 November. There he responded to an insurgency in Nagaland, for which he was awarded the Padma Bhushan in 1968.

Chief of Army Staff
Gen. P. P. Kumaramangalam, retired as chief of army staff (COAS) in June 1969. Though Manekshaw was the most senior army commander, Defence Minister Sardar Swaran Singh favoured Lt. Gen. Harbaksh Singh, who had played a key role as the GOC-in-C of Western Command during the Indo-Pakistani War of 1965. Despite this, Manekshaw was appointed as the eighth chief of the army staff on 8 June 1969. During his tenure, he developed the Indian Army into an efficient instrument of war, and was instrumental in stopping a plan to reserve positions in the army for Scheduled Castes and Scheduled Tribes. Though he was Parsi, a minority group in India, Manekshaw felt that the practice would compromise the ethos of the army and believed that all must be given an equal chance.

In the capacity of COAS, Manekshaw once visited a battalion of 8 Gorkha Rifles in July 1969. He asked an orderly if he knew the name of his chief. The orderly replied that he did, and on being asked to name the chief, he said "Sam Bahadur". This eventually became Manekshaw's nickname.

Indo-Pakistani War of 1971

The Indo-Pakistani War of 1971 was sparked by the Bangladesh Liberation war, a conflict between the traditionally dominant West Pakistanis and the majority East Pakistanis. In 1970, East Pakistanis demanded autonomy for the state, but the Pakistani government failed to satisfy these demands and, in early 1971, a demand for secession took root in East Pakistan. In March, the Pakistan Armed Forces launched a fierce campaign to curb the secessionists, the latter including soldiers and police from East Pakistan. Thousands of East Pakistanis died, and nearly ten million refugees fled to West Bengal, an adjacent Indian state. In April, India decided to assist in the formation of the new nation of Bangladesh.

During a cabinet meeting towards the end of April, Prime Minister Indira Gandhi asked Manekshaw if he was prepared to go to war with Pakistan. He replied that most of his armoured and infantry divisions were deployed elsewhere, only twelve of his tanks were combat-ready, and they would be competing for rail carriages with the grain harvest. He also pointed out the Himalayan passes would soon open up with the forthcoming monsoon, which would result in heavy flooding. After the cabinet had left the room, Manekshaw offered to resign; Gandhi declined and instead sought his advice. He said he could guarantee victory if she would allow him to handle the conflict on his own terms, and set a date for it; Gandhi agreed.

Following the strategy planned by Manekshaw, the army launched several preparatory operations in East Pakistan, including training and equipping the Mukti Bahini, a local militia group of Bengali nationalists. About three brigades of regular Bangladeshi troops were trained, and 75,000 guerrillas were trained and equipped with arms and ammunition. These forces were used to harass the Pakistani Army stationed in East Pakistan in the lead-up to the war.

The war started officially on 3 December 1971, when Pakistani aircraft bombed Indian Air Force bases in the western part of the country. The Army Headquarters, under Manekshaw's leadership, formulated the following strategy: II Corps, commanded by Lt. Gen. Tapishwar Narain Raina (later general and COAS), was to enter from the west; IV Corps, commanded by Lt. Gen. Sagat Singh, was to enter from the east; XXXIII Corps, commanded by Lt. Gen. Mohan L. Thapan, was to enter from the north; and the 101 Communication Zone Area, commanded by Maj. Gen. Gurbax Singh, was to provide support from the northeast. This strategy was to be executed by the Eastern Command, under Lt. Gen. Jagjit Singh Aurora. Manekshaw instructed Lt. Gen. J.F.R. Jacob, chief of staff Eastern Command, to inform the Indian prime minister that orders were being issued for the movement of troops from Eastern Command. The following day, the navy and the air force also initiated full-scale operations on both eastern and western fronts.

As the war progressed, Pakistan's resistance crumbled. India captured most of the advantageous positions and isolated the Pakistani forces, which started to surrender or withdraw. The UN Security Council assembled on 4 December 1971 to discuss the situation. After lengthy discussions on 7 December, the United States put forward a resolution for "immediate cease-fire and withdrawal of troops" While supported by the majority, the USSR vetoed it twice and, because of Pakistani atrocities against Bengalis, the United Kingdom and France abstained.

Manekshaw addressed the Pakistani troops by radio broadcast on 9, 11 and 15 December, assuring them that they would receive honourable treatment from the Indian troops if they surrendered. The last two broadcasts were delivered as replies to messages from the Pakistani commanders Maj. Gen. Rao Farman Ali and Lt. Gen. Amir Abdullah Khan Niazi to their troops, which were to have a devastating effect; they convinced the troops of the pointlessness of further resistance, and led to their defeat.

On 11 December, Ali messaged the United Nations requesting a ceasefire, but it was not authorised by President Yahya Khan, and the fighting continued. Following several discussions and consultations, and subsequent attacks by the Indian forces, Khan decided to stop the war in order to save the lives of Pakistani soldiers. The actual decision to surrender was taken by Niazi on 15 December and was conveyed to Manekshaw through the United States Consul General in Dhaka via Washington. Manekshaw replied that he would stop the war only if the Pakistani troops surrendered to their Indian counterparts by 09:00 on 16 December. The deadline was extended to 15:00 the same day at Niazi's request, and the instrument of surrender was formally signed on 16 December 1971 by Lt. Gen. Amir Abdullah Khan Niazi

When the prime minister asked Manekshaw to go to Dhaka and accept the surrender of Pakistani forces, he declined, saying that the honour should go to the GOC-in-C Eastern Command, Lt. Gen. Jagjit Singh Aurora. Concerned about maintaining discipline in the aftermath of the conflict, Manekshaw issued strict instructions forbidding looting and rape and stressed the need to respect and stay away from women. As a result, according to Singh, cases of looting and rape were negligible. In addressing his troops on the matter, Manekshaw was quoted as saying: "When you see a Begum (Muslim woman), keep your hands in your pockets, and think of Sam."

The war was for 12 days and saw 94,000 Pakistani soldiers taken prisoner. It ended with the unconditional surrender of Pakistan's eastern half and resulted in the birth of Bangladesh as a new nation. In addition to the POWs, Pakistan suffered 6,000 casualties against India's 2,000. After the war, Manekshaw became known for his compassion towards the POWs. Singh recounts that in some cases he addressed them personally and talked to them privately, with just his aide-de-camp for company, while they shared a cup of tea. He ensured that they were well treated by the Indian Army, made provisions for them to be supplied with the copies of the Quran, and allowed them to celebrate festivals and receive letters and parcels from their loved ones.

Promotion to field marshal
After the war, Gandhi decided to promote Manekshaw to the rank of field marshal and appoint him as the Chief of the Defence Staff (CDS). However, after several objections from the commanders of the navy and the air force, the appointment was dropped. It was felt that, because Manekshaw was from the army, the comparatively smaller forces of the navy and air force would be neglected. Moreover, bureaucrats felt that it might challenge their influence over defence issues. Though Manekshaw was to retire in June 1972, his term was extended by a period of six months, and "in recognition of outstanding services to the Armed Forces and the nation," he was promoted to the rank of field marshal on 1 January 1973. The first Indian Army officer to be so promoted, he was formally conferred with the rank in a ceremony held at Rashtrapati Bhavan on 3 January.

Honours and post-retirement

For his service to the Indian Nation, the President of India awarded Manekshaw the Padma Vibhushan in 1972. Manekshaw retired from active service on 15 January 1973 after a career of nearly four decades; he settled with his wife, Silloo, in Coonoor, the civilian town next to Wellington Cantonment where he had served as commandant of the Defence Services Staff College earlier in his career. Popular with Gurkha soldiers, Nepal fêted Manekshaw as an honorary general of the Nepalese Army in 1972. In 1977, he was awarded the Order of Tri Shakti Patta First Class, an order of knighthood of the Kingdom of Nepal by the King Birendra.

Following his service in the Indian Army, Manekshaw served as an independent director on the board of several companies and, in a few cases, as the chairman. He was outspoken and avoided political correctness; once when he was replaced on the board of a company by a man named Naik at the behest of the government, Manekshaw quipped, "This is the first time in history when a naik (corporal) has replaced a field marshal."

In May 2007, Gohar Ayub, the son of Pakistani field marshal Ayub Khan, claimed that Manekshaw had sold Indian Army secrets to Pakistan during the Indo-Pakistani War of 1965 for 20,000 rupees, but his accusations were dismissed by the Indian defence establishment.

Although Manekshaw was conferred the rank of field marshal in 1973, it was reported that he was not given the complete allowances to which he was entitled. It was not until 2007 that President A. P. J. Abdul Kalam met Manekshaw in Wellington, and presented him with a cheque for —his arrears of pay for over 30 years.

Personal life and death
Manekshaw married Siloo Bode on 22 April 1939 in Bombay. The couple had two daughters, Sherry and Maya (later Maja), born in 1940 and 1945 respectively. Sherry married Batliwala, and they have a daughter named Brandy. Maya was employed by British Airways as a stewardess and married Daruwala, a pilot. The latter couple have two sons named Raoul Sam and Jehan Sam.

Manekshaw died of complications from pneumonia at the Military Hospital in Wellington, Tamil Nadu, at 12:30 a.m. on 27 June 2008 at the age of 94. Reportedly, his last words were "I'm okay!". He was buried in the Parsi cemetery in Ootacamund (Ooty), Tamil Nadu, with military honours, adjacent to his wife's grave. Owing to the controversies in which Manekshaw was involved post-retirement, it was reported that his funeral lacked VIP representation, and no national day of mourning was declared which, while not a breach of protocol, was not customary for a leader of national importance. He was survived by his two daughters and three grandchildren.

Legacy

Annually, on 16 December, Vijay Diwas is celebrated in memory of the victory achieved under Manekshaw's leadership in 1971. On 16 December 2008, a postage stamp depicting Manekshaw in his field marshal's uniform was released by then President Pratibha Patil.

The Manekshaw Centre in Delhi Cantonment is named for the field marshal. Among the finest institutions of the Indian Army, it is a multi-utility, state of art convention centre, spread over 25 acres of landscaped area. The centre was inaugurated by the President of India on 21 Oct 2010. The biannual Army Commanders' conference, the Army's apex level that formulates policy, takes place at the centre. The Manekshaw parade ground in Bangalore is also named for him. The republic day celebrations of Karnataka are held in this ground every year.

A flyover bridge in Ahmedabad's Shivranjeeni area was named after him in 2008 by the then Chief Minister of Gujarat, Narendra Modi. In 2014, a granite statue was erected in his honour at Wellington, in the Nilgiris district, close to the Manekshaw Bridge on the Ooty–Coonoor road, which had been named after him in 2009. His statue is also on Menckji Mehta Road in Pune Cantonment.

In popular culture
 On his life, Meghna Gulzar is directing a movie, Sam Bahadur, starring Vicky Kaushal, which is expected to release in 2023.
 Aaj Tak's show Vande Matram narrated an episode on Manekshaw.
 He's mentioned in Book 3 of Salman Rushdie's novel Midnight's Children in the chapter entitled "Sam and the Tiger".

Awards

Dates of rank

See also
Marshal of the Indian Air Force Arjan Singh
Field Marshal K.M. Cariappa

Notes
Footnotes

Citations

References

External links

1914 births
2008 deaths
Military personnel from Amritsar
Parsi people
Indian Zoroastrians
Gujarati people
Chiefs of Army Staff (India)
Field marshals
Indian marshals
Indian generals
British Indian Army officers
Frontier Force Regiment officers
Indian Army personnel of World War II
People of the Indo-Pakistani War of 1947
People of the 1947 Kashmir conflict
Generals of the Indo-Pakistani War of 1971
Generals of the Bangladesh Liberation War
Indian military personnel of the Indo-Pakistani War of 1971
Recipients of the Padma Vibhushan in civil service
Recipients of the Padma Bhushan in civil service
Indian recipients of the Military Cross
Members of the Order of Tri Shakti Patta, First Class
Recipients of the Military Cross
Sherwood College alumni
Indian Military Academy alumni
Pakistan Command and Staff College alumni
Graduates of the Royal College of Defence Studies
Deaths from pneumonia in India
Commandants of Defence Services Staff College